St. Modomnóc of Ossory (also Domnóc and Dominic) (died c. 550) was an Irish saint and missionary in Osraige who was a disciple of St. David of Wales and a member of the O'Neill royal family. His feast day is February 13.

Life
Modomnoc's name is likely to have been Dominic or Donogh, as the words "my", ("mo") "little" and "dear" were added to Irish saint's names; hence Domnóc's name is often rendered mo Domnóc or Modomnóc. He left Ireland to practice priesthood and crossed the sea to Wales to study under St. David at Menevia.

Beekeeper
One of the best known stories regarding Saint Modomnoc concerns his work as a beekeeper. Bees were kept both for their honey and the production of wax. He was never stung. When the time came for him to return to Ireland, three times the bees followed in great swarm and settled on the mast.

Modomnoc's talking to his bees is in keeping with an Irish folklore custom of ‘Telling the Bees’ which ensures that the bees not feel any offence due to exclusion from family affairs and so will remain with the hive. It was believed that if one didn’t tell the bees of a wedding, a birth, or a death they would take offence and leave. This same custom forms the basis of John Greenleaf Whittier's poem, "Telling the Bees".

Upon returning home he continued his religious services at Tybroughney. He is said to have been honoured with the episcopal dignity, about the middle of the 6th century.

References

External links
HOLY FATHER MODOMNOC OF OSSORY, PATRON SAINT OF BEES Commemorated: February 13/26
St. Modomnoc - Catholic Online
Chaomhánach, Eimear, "The Bee, its Keeper and Produce, in Irish and other Folk Traditions", University College Dublin
"A Saint and His Bees" by Dessi Jackson
 

6th-century Irish priests
Irish beekeepers
6th-century Christian saints
Medieval Irish saints